The 1964 Croydon Council election took place on 7 May 1964 to elect members of Croydon London Borough Council in London, England. The whole council was up for election and the council went into no overall control.

Background
These elections were the first to the newly formed borough. Previously elections had taken place in the County Borough of Croydon and Coulsdon and Purley Urban District. These boroughs and districts were joined to form the new London Borough of Croydon by the London Government Act 1963.

A total of 171 candidates stood in the election for the 60 seats being contested across 20 wards. These included a full slate from the Labour party, while the Conservative and Liberal parties stood 42 each. Other candidates included 9 Residents, 9 Conservative Residents, 5 Independents and 4 Communists. All wards were three-seat wards.

This election had aldermen as well as directly elected councillors.  The Conservatives got 5 aldermen, Labour 3 and Independents 2.

The Council was elected in 1964 as a "shadow authority" but did not start operations until 1 April 1965.

Election result
The results saw no party gain overall control of the new council with both the Conservatives and Labour each winning 21 of the 60 seats. Overall turnout in the election was 38.2%. This turnout included 855 postal votes.

Ward results

Addiscombe

Bensham Manor

Broad Green

Central

Coulsdon East

East

New Addington

Norbury

Purley

Sanderstead & Selsdon

Sanderstead North

Shirley

South Norwood

Thornton Heath

Upper Norwood

Waddon

West Thornton

Whitehorse Manor

Woodcote & Coulsdon West

Woodside

References

1964
1964 London Borough council elections